The 20th National Congress of the Kuomintang were a series of four congresses of the 20th national congress of the Kuomintang in 2017–2020

History

2017
The first congress was held on 20 August 2017 in Taichung, Taiwan.

2018
The second congress was held in 2018 with a baseball theme.

2020
The fourth congress was held on 6 September 2020 at Sun Yat-sen Memorial Hall in Xinyi District, Taipei. The party reaffirmed its commitment to the Constitution of the Republic of China and the 1992 Consensus.

See also
 Kuomintang

References

2017 conferences
2020 conferences
2017 in Taiwan
2020 in Taiwan
National Congresses of the Kuomintang
Politics of Taiwan